Samuel Agar Salvage   (November 20, 1876 – July 10, 1946) was an English businessman, sometimes called the "father of the rayon industry in the United States."

Biography
Salvage was born in London and emigrated to the United States in 1893 at age 17. In 1925, he became the president of The Viscose Company and was later chairman of the board.

In 1942, he was appointed Knight Commander of the Order of the British Empire) for his contributions to the rayon industry.

Personal life
Salvage married Mary Katherine Richmond (d. 1964) and lived together at their home in Old Brookville, New York called Rynwood, which Salvage had built in 1927 by architect Roger Bullard, with gardens designed by Ellen Biddle Shipman. Together, they had three daughters: Katherine H. Salvage, Margaret S. Salvage and Magdelaine S. Salvage.

Salvage died July 10, 1946 at his home on Fisher's Island, New York.

Descendants
Salvage's grandson is Charles Taliaferro (b. 1952), the philosopher specializing in Theology and Philosophy of Religion at St. Olaf College.

See also
Frank Polk

References

1876 births
1946 deaths